Esteban Lozada (born January 8, 1982 in Belgium) is a former Argentine rugby union player who last played for English team London Wasps in the Aviva Premiership. He also played for the Argentina national team and was part of the 2007 Rugby World Cup squad. He debuted with "Los Pumas" on November 11, 2006. Weighing 110 kg (242 lbs), he stands 1.94m tall (6 ft 4in) and his position is lock. In May 2014 Lozada announced his retirement from Rugby.

References

External links
UAR profile
Rugby World Cup 2007 profile

1982 births
Argentine rugby union players
Living people
Rugby union locks
Club Atlético San Isidro rugby union players
RC Toulonnais players
Edinburgh Rugby players
SU Agen Lot-et-Garonne players
Expatriate rugby union players in France
Argentina international rugby union players
Expatriate rugby union players in Scotland
Argentine expatriate sportspeople in France
Argentine expatriate sportspeople in Scotland
Argentine expatriate rugby union players
Argentine expatriate sportspeople in England